The Departmental Council of Corsica was the deliberative assembly of the former French department of  (1790–1793, 1811–1976), on the island of Corsica.

History 
In 1833, when the General Council was created, Corsica had only one department, since the merger of the two departments, Liamone and Golo in 1811. On 1st January 1976, by application of the law of May 15, 1975, it was split into two departments: Haute-Corse and Corse-du-Sud, resulting in the dissolution of the single general council.

List of Presidents 
The following is a list of presidents of the General Council from 1880 to 1976:

 around 1880: Patrice de Corsi
 1888-1908: Emmanuel Arène
 1908-1919: 
 1919: Adolphe Landry
 1920-1921: Vincent de Moro-Giafferi
 1921-1922: Adolphe Landry
 1922-1923: 
 1923-1924: Adolphe Landry
 1924-1927: Vincent de Moro-Giafferi
 1927-1930: Adolphe Landry
 1930-1931: René-François de Casabianca
 1931-1937: François Piétri
 1937-1938: Adolphe Landry
 1938-1940: Camille de Rocca Serra
 1945-1951: Paul Giacobbi
 1951-1953: 
 1953-1956: Jean Augustin Seta
 1956-1959: 
 1959-1976:

See also 
 Corsican Assembly, est. 1982, is again since 2018 the only deliberative assembly on the island after merging with the former departmental councils of Corse-du-Sud and Haute-Corse.

References 

Corsica
France
Former departments of France in Corsica